Gunashekar Vignesh (born 30 September 1988) is an Indian professional footballer who plays as a midfielder for Bengaluru United in the I-League 2nd Division.

Career
Born in Karnataka, Bangalore, Vignesh began his career with I-League club Pune before moving to Chirag United Kerala in 2011. After spending a season in Kerala, Vignesh signed with South United. After spending time with South United, Vignesh returned to the I-League, signing with Bharat. After spending a season with Bharat, Vignesh signed for Ozone of the Bangalore Super Division.

On 22 March 2018, Vignesh was captain of the Karnataka squad for the Santosh Trophy as they defeated Goa in their first match. He also scored the first goal for his state in the 54th minute as Karnataka won 4–1.

In 2019, Vignesh played for Bangalore Eagles in the Bangalore Super Division. A few months later, Vignesh began playing for Bengaluru United in the I-League 2nd Division. For the 2019–20 season, Vignesh was the captain of Bengaluru United.

References

External links
 Indian Super League Profile

1988 births
Living people
Indian footballers
Pune FC players
Chirag United Club Kerala players
South United FC players
Odisha FC players
Association football midfielders
Footballers from Bangalore
I-League players
I-League 2nd Division players
Bangalore Super Division players
Karnataka footballers
Santosh Trophy players
FC Bengaluru United players
Bharat FC players
Indian Super League players
Ozone FC players